The 2018 UK Seniors Championship (sponsored by Credit Risk Solutions) was a senior snooker tournament, that took place at the Bonus Arena in Hull, England, from 24 to 25 October 2018. It was the first event of the 2018/2019 World Seniors Tour.

Jimmy White was the defending champion, but he lost 0–3 to Suchakree Poomjang in the quarterfinals. Ken Doherty won the event, defeating Brazil's Igor Figueiredo in the final 4–1.

Prize fund
The breakdown of prize money is shown below:
 Winner: £10,000 and a place in the 2019 World Championships qualifying
Runner-up: £5,000
Semi-finals: £2,500
Group runner-ups: £1,000
Highest break: £500
Total: £24,500

Main draw

 All matches played with a 30-second shot clock, with players having two time-outs per match
 *Re-spotted black replaced final frame deciders

Final

References 

World Seniors Tour
2018 in snooker
2018 in English sport
Snooker competitions in England
Sport in Kingston upon Hull
October 2018 sports events in the United Kingdom
2010s in Kingston upon Hull